Lewis David Einstein (March 15, 1877 – December 4, 1967) was an American diplomat and historian.

Early life
Einstein was born on March 15, 1877, in New York City. He was the only son of wool magnate David Lewis Einstein (1839–1909) and, his wife, Caroline (née Fatman) Einstein (1852–1910). Lewis had two sisters: Amy Einstein, who married Joel Elias Spingarn, and Florence Einstein, who married Sir Charles Waldstein. 

Among his family was uncle, Henry L. Einstein, the proprietor of The New York Press, and Judah P. Benjamin, a U.S. Senator from Louisiana who served as the Confederate States Attorney General, Secretary of War, and Secretary of State.

Einstein graduated from Columbia University in 1898, and earned a master's degree in 1899.

Career
Einstein's diplomatic career began in 1903, when he was appointed as Third Secretary of Legation at Constantinople. Einstein advanced from Second Secretary to First Secretary and then Charge d'Affairs during the Young Turk Revolution of 1908, remaining in Constantinople despite the hostilities.

For one month in 1911, he served as United States Ambassador to Costa Rica (having been appointed by President William H. Taft) before his wife's ill health in the country's high altitude forced him to leave the post.

Books and writings
In the winter 1912/13, he published anonymously the article "The Anglo-German Rivalry and the United States" in the British magazine The National Review, in which he warned of a coming war between Germany and Britain, claiming that "unperceived by many Americans, the European balance of power is a political necessity which can alone sanction on the Western Hemisphere the continuance of an economic development unhandicapped by the burden of extensive armaments" and that "if ever decisive results are about to be registered of a nature calculated to upset what has for centuries been the recognized political fabric of Europe, America can remain indifferent thereto only at its own eventual cost. If it then neglects to observe that the interests of the nations crushed are likewise its own, America will be guilty of political blindness which it will later rue."

In November 1914, when the First World War was already raging, he published a second article "The War and American Policy" in the same publication. Both articles were in early 1918 reprinted as a book with a foreword by Theodore Roosevelt

He returned to Constantinople in 1915, and wrote his diaries which would be later published under the name Inside Constantinople: A Diplomatist's Diary During the Dardanelles. Einstein kept the diary from the months of April to September, covering the Entente's campaign to conquer the capital city of the Ottoman Empire starting with a landing on the northern shore of the Dardanelles, which went in the history as the defeat of the Gallipoli Campaign (Gelibolu in modern Turkish).

Einstein also paid special attention to the massacres of Armenians and wrote about it extensively throughout the diary. He described the events and stated that "the policy of murder then carried out was planned in the coldest blood" in the preface of his diary. Einstein blamed the cooperative pact between Germany and the Ottoman Empire as the supportive and responsible agents behind the massacres

He also pointed out that the stockpiles of armaments that was used as a justification for the arrests was in fact a "myth". By August 4, Einstein wrote in a diary entry that the "persecution of Armenians is assuming unprecedented proportions, and is carried out with nauseating thoroughness." He kept in contact with both Enver and Talat and tried to persuade them to reverse their policy towards the Armenians. In a diary entry, he states that Talat insisted that the Armenians sided with the enemies and that Enver believed the policy was out of military necessity, but in reality both leaders feared the Armenians.

U.S. Minister to Czechoslovakia
On October 8, 1921, Warren Harding appointed Einstein to replace Richard Crane as the United States Envoy Extraordinary and Minister Plenipotentiary to Czechoslovakia. He was recommended by Senators Wadsworth and William M. Calder. He presented his credentials on December 20, 1921, and held the position until he left his post on February 1, 1930. He was also a member of the Council on Foreign Relations.

Personal life
In 1904, he married Helen (née Carew) Ralli (1863–1949), a noted Anglo-Greek beauty who was fourteen years older than him. Helen was a daughter of Robert Russell Carew and her sister, Jessica Philippa Carew, was married to Francis Stonor, 4th Baron Camoys. This marriage led to friction between Einstein and his father, who worried that Ralli would damage the younger Einstein's career; Ralli was twice a divorcee (including to Alexander Ralli), and divorced women could not be received in some European courts. From his wife's marriage to Ralli, she was the mother of Marguerite Christine Ralli, who later married William Hay, 11th Marquess of Tweeddale, becoming the Marchioness of Tweeddale.

Einstein was disinherited by his father after marrying Ralli, except for a sum of $125,000. After Einstein's death, newspapers reported that a $1,250,000 share of the elder Einstein's estate, valued in total at approximately $4,000,000, had been set aside for Lewis Einstein in the event that he divorced his wife, and that it passed to his sister Lady Waldstein after he declined to do so. This report was denied by Lady Waldstein, who indicated that the father's only wish regarding Lewis Einstein was to see that he was "taken care of", a means she accomplished by granting him an annual allowance of $20,000. Earlier, Lewis had received nothing from the estate of his mother Caroline Einstein, who instead divided her property among Einstein's sisters and various friends among European nobility.

After the death of his first wife on June 25, 1949, he remarried to Camilla Elizabeth (née Hare) Lippincott (1879–1976) in 1950. Camilla was the widow of Jay Bucknell Lippincott and daughter of Brig. Gen. Luther Rector Hare, known for participating in the Battle of the Little Big Horn.

Einstein died at his home in Paris, France, on December 2, 1967, and was buried at Père Lachaise Cemetery in Paris.

Honors and awards
Einstein received the following honors and awards:
 Officer of the Legion of Honor.
 Grand Officer, S.S. Maurice and Lazarus.
 Received a presentation plate from the British Government.
 Grand Cross of the Order of the White Lion.

Authorship
Einstein wrote the following books:
 Inside Constantinople : A Diplomatist's Diary during the Dardanelles Expedition, April–September 1915 (1918)
 Roosevelt : His Mind in Action (1930)
 Divided Loyalties : Americans in England during the War of Independence (1933)
 A Diplomat Looks Back (1968)

Einstein also engaged in a longtime correspondence with Oliver Wendell Holmes, Jr., and in 1964 their collected letters were published in the volume The Holmes-Einstein Letters : Correspondence of Mr. Justice Holmes and Lewis Einstein 1903–1935, edited by James Bishop Peabody.

See also
Witnesses and testimonies of the Armenian genocide

Bibliography

References

Further reading
Liebmann, George W. Diplomacy between the Wars: Five Diplomats and the Shaping of the Modern World (London  I. B. Tauris, 2008), covers Einstein

External links
 
 
 

1877 births
1967 deaths
Columbia College (New York) alumni
Ambassadors of the United States to Costa Rica
Ambassadors of the United States to Czechoslovakia
Witnesses of the Armenian genocide
Grand Officers of the Order of Saints Maurice and Lazarus
Grand Crosses of the Order of the White Lion